Big Phil may refer to:

People
Luiz Felipe Scolari, Brazilian football manager and former professional footballer
Phillip Leuluai, New Zealand rugby league player
 Big Phil, a producer on the Indo G. album Purple Drank (2007)

Other uses
Big Phil, a character in the 1915 film A Gentleman of Leisure and the 1923 remake
Big Phil, a 2004 edition of the Vienna Philharmonic coin consisting of 31.103 kg of pure gold

See also

Big Fill, a railroad project in Utah, United States
 
 Phil (disambiguation)
 Big (disambiguation)

Lists of people by nickname